The 2022–23 season is the 52nd season in the existence of Paris Saint-Germain Féminine and the club's 36th season in the top flight of French football. In addition to the domestic league, they are participating in this season's editions of the Coupe de France Féminine and the UEFA Women's Champions League, having finished runners-up to Lyon in the Trophée des Champions at the start of the season.

Ahead of the 2022-23 season, it was announced that Didier Ollé-Nicolle would leave the club after a single season in charge with former Lyon manager Gérard Prêcheur replacing him as manager. Former Lyon goalkeeper Sarah Bouhaddi also joined the club having won eight UEFA Women's Champions League titles and eleven French championships with OL. PSG also acquired two notable Dutch internationals in the summer window with Jackie Groenen joining the club for a reported fee of €150,000 from Manchester United and former  World Player of the Year Lieke Martens joining on a free transfer from Barcelona.

However, the most notable news of the club's pre-season was an injury to Marie-Antoinette Katoto who had become the club's record goal scorer during the 2021-22 campaign. Katoto suffered a torn ACL while playing for France at the Euros against Belgium. The severity of the injury is likely to cause Katoto to miss the entirety of the 2022-23 season.

Kits

Players

First-team squad

As of 5 March 2023.

Transfers

In

Out

Pre-season and friendlies 
PSG began the season by competing in the four-team AMOS Women's French Cup held in Toulouse. The club then travelled to Catalonia for a temporary training camp ahead of their return to France for the Trophée des Championnes before playing a final in-season friendly at the club's training facility prior to their opening match of the league season.

Competitions

Overall record

Division 1 Féminine

League table

Results summary

Results by round

Matches

Coupe de France

Trophée des Championnes

UEFA Champions League

Second Qualifying Round

The draw for the second qualifying round was held on 1 September 2022.

Paris Saint-Germain won 4–1 on aggregate.

Group stage

The group stage draw was held on 3 October 2022.

Knockout phase

Quarter-finals
The draw for the quarter-finals will be held on 10 February 2023.

Statistics

Goals

References

Paris Saint-Germain Féminine seasons
Paris Saint-Germain Féminine